Smorodino is a rural locality (a selo) and the administrative center of Smorodisnkoye Rural Settlement, Grayvoronsky District, Belgorod Oblast, Russia. The population was 633 as of 2010. There are 11 streets.

Geography 
Smorodino is located 22 km northwest of Grayvoron (the district's administrative centre) by road. Dorogoshch is the nearest rural locality.

References 

Rural localities in Grayvoronsky District